The 1854 Philadelphia mayoral election saw the election of Robert T. Conrad.

This was the first mayoral election since Philadelphia's county-city consolidation. It was also the first election to a two-year term, with previous elections having been to only a single-year term. It was also the last won by the Whig Party.

Results

References

1854
Philadelphia
Philadelphia mayoral
19th century in Philadelphia